Palitpur is a village  in Burdwan I CD Block in Bardhaman Sadar North subdivision of Purba Bardhaman district in West Bengal, India. It is famous for the ashram and samādhi (tomb) of Tibbetibaba, a famous saint.

Geography 
Palitpur is located in Saraitikar Panchayat area of Burdwan-I Block and it falls within the jurisdiction of Burdwan Sadar (North) Sub-Division of Bardhaman district.

It is a small village located near the northern part of Burdwan town.  On the eastern part of the village is the narrow gauge railway track between Katwa and Burdwan.  There is also an unmanned level crossing at Palitpur in Burdwan.

Demographics 
As per the 2011 Census of India, Palitpur had a total population of 2,089 of which 1,042 (50%) were males and 1,047 (50%) were females. Population below 6 years was 259. The total number of literates in Palitpur was 1,295 (70.77% of the population over 6 years).

 India census, Palitpur had a population of 1,747. The male population was 880 and female population was 867. The Scheduled Caste population was 560 and Scheduled Tribe population was 301.

History

Tibbetibaba 

In early part of the first quarter of the Twentieth century, Bhootnath Ta, the erstwhile Zamindar of Palitpur had donated a piece of land in Palitpur for the construction of Ashram by Tibbetibaba, a great saint of India. Bhootnath Ta was an eminent disciple of  Tibbetibaba.
Dharmadas Mondal, another notable disciple of Tibbetibaba, was also a resident of this village.

The Ashram consists of a one-storied building, a pond, a Samādhi (tomb) of Tibbetibaba, Soham Swami and some other disciples

References 

 Ghosh, Sudhanshu Ranjan, "Bharater Sadhak O Sadhika"(Bengali edition), India: Tuli Kalam Publication, 1, College Row, Kolkata – 700 009 (1992.Bengali calendar year – 1399), pp. 318–343
 Chakravorty, Subodh, "Bharater Sadhak – Sadhika"(Bengali edition), India: Kamini Publication, 115, Akhil Mistry Lane, Kolkata – 700 009 (1997.Bengali calendar year – 1404), Volume 1, pp. 450–478 and 500-522
 Hornby, A S, "Oxford Advanced Learner's Dictionary of Current English" (5th ed.), UK: Oxford University Press (1998). , pp. 1433–1475.

Villages in Purba Bardhaman district
Tibbetibaba